St. William is a US Catholic parish founded in January 1920 in the Philadelphia Pennsylvania neighborhood of Lawncrest. The parish originally served 70 households. The Parish elementary school was opened in 1924. The parish eventually expanded to include a rectory, convent, kindergarten, lower school, junior high school, day care center, parish hall and the two churches. The school, which reached a peak enrollment of 1,586 students in 1964, closed on June 15, 2012 with a final enrollment of 280 students. As of 2019, the church served 1,830 households totaling 5,080 people and Mass attendance currently averages 1,300 people, spread among the 8 Sunday Masses.

History

The 1920s & 30s - the beginnings of the parish

In the early part of the 20th century, the area currently comprising Saint William Parish in the Archdiocese of Philadelphia , made up of the communities of Lawndale and the Northern part of Crescentville, was part of Presentation BVM Parish in nearby Cheltenham, Pennsylvania which was under the leadership of Rev. William A Motley. When the Diocese began planning for a new parish in the developing part of Lower Northeast Philadelphia, Archbishop Dennis Dougherty asked Rev. Motley if he wished to remain at Presentation or would he like to lead a new parish?...his answer was clear and on January 20, 1920, St. William Parish was officially founded under Motley's leadership named in honor of the Hermit; William of Vercelli.

Immediately, a worship location was secured at the Germania Maennerchor Hall (**) at 514 Devereaux Ave with the first mass being held on Jan 23. The new Parish comprising 70 families, spread out within the boundaries of; Cottman Ave to the North, Tookany Creek to the West and Roosevelt Boulevard to the South and East.  A Rectory was established at 415 Levick Street that included a small chapel. In 1922, a move to 909 Levick street would be prompted by need for additional space.

(**) Some 60 years later, this same building was bought by the Parish and converted into the parish day care center. It was sold in 1999.

In 1921, ground was broken for the combination Church/School at Rising Sun Avenue and Robbins Street. Built of local Bethayres stone. It was dedicated on Nov 27, 1921 by Bishop Michael Crane. In 1923, the parishes of St. Ambrose and - St Martin Of Tours were established which ate up a large portion of St. William's Southern and Eastern parts.  New (and current) boundaries were Magee Ave to the North, Phila/Mont.Co Twnshp Line/Philadelphia, Newtown and New York Railroad/Newtown Branch of the Reading Railroad Company to the West, the Oxford Branch of the Pennsylvania Railroad now Pennway Street/Air line through the Naval Supply Depot to the East and Allengrove Street To the South. 
 
In 1924, the St. William elementary school opened for 100 students under the direction of the Sisters of the Servants of the Immaculate Heart of Mary order. The two sisters commuted from St. Joachim's Parish in Frankford each day and  converted the church interior for school use during the week, using the pews as desks and kneelers as seats.   In 1925, fundraising was begun to build additions to the chapel/school, and by 1929 two additional floors were built to the existing building to give a total of 12 classrooms for the 450 students. The Chapel was eventually converted into a hall, once the new church was completed. This addition to the school  was dedicated on October 5, 1930 by Cardinal Dougherty.

A new "basement church" was constructed closer to Devereaux Avenue, completed in 1927, also of Bethayres stone construction with a traditional gothic look on the interior. The Main Church was to be built atop this structure once enough funds were raised and other 'priority building' was completed. A new Rectory was also built in 1927. In 1948, construction was begun on a new convent building. Up to this time the Sisters had been housed in a group of row homes behind the Lower School on Robbins Street where the current Memorial Hall now stands. Most of the buildings of the Parish built between 1920 and 1948 were designed by the Henry D. Dagit & Sons Firm.

The 1940s and World War II

During this time, as the country was in the midst of the Second World War, people who lived in St William sold war bonds, collected scrap metals, served as civilian air raid wardens, and grew food on available land. In May 1943 a party was conducted under the Holy Name Society for returning service personnel from the parish. Twelve men killed in the war were honored with a bronze plaque at a special mass on May 30 of that same year.

317 names appeared on the Roll of Honor of St. William parishioners who served in the armed forces during World War II.

The 1950s and 60s – times of change, and growth

The postwar years of the 1950s and '60s saw many changes come to the physical plant of the Parish that reflected the housing boom of the area, the economic upswing of the times and the growing parish population. Many of the original "Motley Buildings" were completely replaced. The Middle School (Junior High/Upper School) building was built and later an additional floor was added. When consideration was had for the completion of the Upper Church, it was found that the basement church was not structurally sufficient to support additional construction.  In 1955, the old church was demolished to make way for the current granite and sandstone building designed by the Gleeson & Mulrooney Architectural firm.  The first mass was said in the new church (lower) on December 25, 1956. This Church, now the parish's third, seated 1,000. All of the stained glass windows and some appointments were used from the second church. While structurally complete the parish was still without a "Main Church" as construction debts prohibited completion of the interior of the Upper Church (seating 1,250) until June 1963.

In 1965 with school enrollment now at over 1500, plans were drawn up for a new school building with 12 classrooms to be built behind the Lower School on Robbins, again where Memorial Hall now stands. A fire in early 1966 that destroyed the Rectory shelved those plans and the building was never built. A temporary Rectory was established at 6145 Argyle Street. The current Rectory was completed in 1967.

All substantial changes to the parish physical plant were during the 24-year reign of Father William Boyle - a quiet, deeply religious man, a strong administrator well liked and commonly known by parishioners as "The Builder." It was also during his administration that the parish population nearly tripled in size.

The 1970s – prosperity

The 1970s were relatively quiet construction years for the parish but that's not to say they were not busy ones. The most notable "beginning" during this time was the Parish Carnival, started by Fr. Kimble in 1974. As a source of funds for expansion and maintenance of the Parish facilities, the Carnival would last for well over a decade with its largest year being in 1986, when over $50,000 was netted from this week-long event. The Carnival had had its last hurrah when the decision was made to construct a much needed hall in 1988 which took up half the grounds used for the event. It was also under the leadership of Fr. Kimble, that the Home and School Association, the CYO, the Boy Scout Troop, and the St. William Senior Citizen's Club were all either started or reestablished in the Parish.

The 1980s – renewed growth

In 1980 James E. Mortimer became St William's 6th pastor, a post he would hold for 22 years. In 1981 school tuition fees were established with minimum weekly payments required from parents. During his tenure several refurbishments were carried out, in many cases with help from parishioners.

In 1986 the Kindergarten Building was completed entirely by parish volunteers and the "St. William Creche" dedicated. A  case, it built in the Narthex of the Upper Church to house wooden  statues for the Nativity, Resurrection and Crucifixion, that were carved by parishioner Gregor Betz.

In 1988 "Memorial Hall" at Robbins and Argyle was completed at a cost of $1.25 million and dedicated by Archbishop Bevilacqua.

In 1989 The Adoration Chapel was opened, dedicated to Mother Katherine Drexel. It is behind the Lower Church Altar with entrance off Argyle Street.

The vacant Annex of the old Lawndale Hospital (now Kindred Hospital) at 6200 Palmetto Street was purchased and provided 14 additional classrooms in 1993. It was known as the Primary School. Eenrollment at this time was over 1,300 but shortly after this building opened, the numbers started to drop.

Mortimer organised quite elaborate decorations for the various holidays over the years. One most public display, that continues in form to this day, is the Christmas light display with every parish building and tree lit up over the holiday.

The 1990s – at 75 years, the parish peaks

By the early 1990s, the Parish, which had started off seventy years earlier with 70 families in a small room, was now a complex of nine buildings and two large churches. Over 9,600 parishioners were on the register and attendance at the Sunday masses was over 4,500 people.  In 1995, the Parish celebrated its 75th anniversary.

Starting in the mid-90s, white flight began to take hold on the Lower Northeast. The German, Irish, Polish and Italian make up of the parish was being augmented by Hispanic, Asian and African Americans who were moving into the community. The Parish welcomed the newcomers. Still, registration dropped to 8,900 by 1997 then down to just over 7,000 by 2002.  School enrollment dropped from 1,100 in 1997 to just over 700 in 2002. According to Kathleen McDonough, who grew up in the area, Mortimer actively welcomed new arrivals from different ethnic backgrounds, including priests and members of the congregation from Hispanic and South Asian backgrounds.

Though major change was taking place, St. William parish was listed as one of the top 300 parishes in the US in the book "Excellent Catholic Parishes: The Guide to Best Places and Practices" in 2001. St William was one of three parishes in the Diocese and the only parish within the City of Philadelphia to receive this recognition.

The 2000s – renewal

In 2002, Msgr. Mortimer retired and Msgr. Nelson Perez, now Bishop Nelson J. Perez, was installed as the 7th Pastor of St William. According to Kathleen McDonough, who grew up in the area, Perez actively welcomed new arrivals from different ethnic backgrounds. Bonnie Coccagna recalled that the then-mostly white congregation felt anxiety as Perez actively spoke about the influx of non-white people into the neighborhood and tolerating people who are sinning.

While the young Msgr. Perez came into a parish full of life and vigor, he also came into a parish burdened with major debt of over a half million dollars and a physical plant neglected.  During his time, over $360,000 in repairs were made to the various buildings, including repair of the heating systems for both churches, repairs to the air conditioning in the Lower Church (the Upper Church does not have A/C), stone re-pointing, repainting the Lower Church (led by the Parish's Scout Troop), plaster & paint repairs to the Upper Church, replacement of the sound systems in both churches,  replacement of the Convent heating system, repair and reconstruction of an entire corner of the Lower School building, replacement of roofs on both school buildings. Through the generosity of a local company, an alarm system was installed in the church, new carpeting was installed in the Lower Church, along with new seats for the Chapel. The Primary School (Hospital Annex) was closed and the building leased out to the Sisters of the IHM for a Ministry Center for a period of 5 years.  The debt that welcomed the Msgr. Perez at the door was reduced significantly, bills were brought current, and a treasury was established.  This could not have been accomplished without the dedication of the Parishioners of St William. Their generosity of time, talent and treasure given to the Parish has always been unmatched.

On January 12, 2009, Msgr. Perez was assigned as Pastor of St. Agnes Parish, in West Chester, Pa.  In his place, St William Parish welcomed the Reverend Scott Brockson as Pastoral Administrator.  Fr. Brockson, formerly Pastor of St. Hugh's in North Philadelphia, would hold this temporary position until news came in May 2009 of the assignment of Fr. Joseph G. Watson as the 8th Pastor of St. William Parish.  Fr. Watson, a graduate of St. William School, was ordained in 1992 and had served as Pastor of St. Charles Borromeo Parish at 20th and Christian Sts., in South Philadelphia prior to his assignment to St. Wililam. Fr. Watson served St. William Parish until June 20, 2016, when he was reassigned as pastor of Nativity of Our Lord in Warminster PA.

Fr. Scott Brockson remained at St William Parish as an assistant along with Fr. Skip Miller until their new parish assignments took effect in June 2010. Fr Scott took over as Pastor of St. Augustine in Bridgeport and Fr. Skip became a Parochial Vicar for nearby St. Cecilia Parish in Fox Chase.

Fr. Dominic Ishaq served at St. William as a Part-Time Parochial Vicar and Coordinator of the Pakistani Community of the Diocese, from 2004 until 2015.

The 2010s – change and consolidation

With changes and closures to parishes in the Diocese, in 2013, St. William was again blessed with the addition of two more priests serving the parish, for a total of 4 priests residing in the Rectory. Fr. Augusto "Gus" Concha was assigned to reside and serve the Hispanic Community of the Parish, and also serve the Hispanic Community of St. Helena Parish in Olney. Fr. Gus officially retired on June 20, 2016, and remains as a Retired Priest in Residence at St. William, where his brother Fr. Alfonso "Al" Concha now serves as pastor.  With the coming of the Haitian Community from the closed Incarnation of Our Lord Church (2013), the parish welcomed their Chaplain, Fr. Vilardi. Shortly after his arrival, his order decided to change him to another ministry, and after 8 years of serving the Haitian Population of Philadelphia, they bid farewell to their spiritual leader and welcomed Fr. Alfred Lauricien who now serves the Haitian Community and the Parish.

On May 21, 2016, Archbishop Chaput announced the changes for Clergy that included reassigning our Pastor, Fr. Joe Watson, to now serve as Pastor of Nativity of Our Lord Parish in Warminster PA., and that the Reverend Alfonso J. Concha would become the 9th Pastor to serve the Parish of St. William. The official Change took place on June 20, 2016. A fond farewell was held on June 19 for Fr. Watson in Memorial Hall, with over 500 people attending the Noon Mass and the reception that followed.

It was also announced that Fr. Tariq Issac would be reassigned from the Diocese of Harrisburg, to serve St. William Parish as a Parochial Vicar and Chaplain of the Pakistani people of the Diocese of Philadelphia. Fr. Issac took up residence at St. William on June 20, 2016.

The parish today

With 8 Masses each Sunday, attendance is still strong, averaging just under 1,300 people with a current registration of over 5,000 people - as of 2019. There are five English Masses (5:00pm vigil, 7:30 & 9:00am, 12:00 and 8:00pm), one Spanish Mass (10:30am), one Pakistani Mass (4:00pm), and one Haitian Mass (5:30pm)  celebrated each weekend.

The parish offers one of the latest Sunday Masses in the City of Philadelphia (8:00pm)

Two daily English Masses (6:00am and noon) see an additional 100 or so people attending each day, many from the surrounding business community as well as from the Navy Depot on Tabor Road.  St. William Parish also hosts a weekly Mass on Thursdays for 100 people, and a Sunday Communion Service at the Philadelphia Protestant Home which is a large retirement community within the parish that despite its name, has a significant population of Catholics.

Currently, there are 4 priests living in the Parish Rectory, and a dozen Sister Servants of the Immaculate Heart Of Mary living in the Parish Convent. Two Deacons also serve the Parish.

The school

St William School was under the direction of the Sisters of the Immaculate Heart of Mary, nicknamed "Macs", from its opening in September 1924 until its closing in June 2012. Since opening, enrollment had risen and fallen with the times and the waves of population changes within the parish. Enrollment peaked in 1964, at 1,586, dropped to around 800 by the early 1980s, and peaked again in 1992 at nearly 1,300.

St. William School enrollment held around 400 for several of its final years, but started dropping again in 2009. Final enrollment for the 2011-2012 year was just over 280 students. The parish would close the last few fiscal years with an annual operating deficit for the School of around $200,000. For the fiscal year ending 2012, the Parish Church had an operating surplus of $140,000, however the Parish School's operating loss was $340,000, leaving the Parish, as a whole, with an operating shortfall of $200,000.

St. William was not alone in the financial struggle to operate a parish school.

On January 6, 2012, it was announced that the Diocese would close or consolidate over 40 Catholic Elementary and Secondary schools in the five-county region. Originally, St. William and St. Cecilia's in Fox Chase, 3 miles away,  were to merge in September for the School Year 2012-13, forming a new Regional School with a new name and new staff. After a strong appeal by St. Cecilia's to remain an independent parish school, and the request of many St. William Parish families from day one to be able to send their children to Presentation BVM in Cheltenham, just 7 blocks away, it was decided to close St. William School outright, which allowed parents a choice of which local school to attend, yet remain active parishioners of St. William.  The Parish must still subsidize each student $800, regardless of the Catholic school chosen, but this is far less of a financial burden, to the parish, compared to running its own school.

A Mass of Thanksgiving and Reception was held on Sunday, June 10, 2012, just before the school closed, to celebrate the nearly 88-year history of St. William School. Well over 1,000 people attended the standing room only Mass which was moved to the Lower Church for air conditioning, due to the 90+ degree day.

After closure, both school buildings were put up for lease, and then housed Tacony Academy Charter High School until June 2015, when Tacony Academy completed its own building in the Tacony Section of the City.  The buildings were again put up for lease and two different schools approached the Parish requesting use of the buildings. St William welcomed MaST II Charter School for the 2016-17/18 school year and continue to remain great tenants.

German/Irish heritage of Lawndale and Crescentville

The area comprising the section of LawnCrest directly around the Parish church, in the late 19th century, was originally a small German community known to some as Marburg.  The community has always had a strong presence of the Protestant Church throughout. In fact, there are no less than 12 well established Protestant (Lutheran, Methodist, Episcopal and Baptist) churches within the physical boundaries of St William Parish, and the oldest Protestant Church in the Lawndale end of the neighborhood dates back to the year 1698. As stated earlier, St. William began its days in the German Men's Chorus Hall (Germania Maennerchor) on Devereaux Ave and was founded as a German Catholic Parish though this fact is not as well known today.  The German heritage can be seen throughout the church, with one of the most notable symbols being within in the Lower Church through the Imperial Crown chandeliers with the Iron Cross festooned on each of the 8 sides of each fixture.  However, with the post WW2 housing boom of this area seeing a move up of Irish Catholics from the "old neighborhoods" of North Philadelphia to the Lower Northeast, the latter half of the 20th century saw nearly two-thirds of the neighborhood populace registered at St. William, during which time, LawnCrest was considered a large Catholic Community, commonly, Irish. According to the 1990 Census, there were 15,446 people living within the physical boundaries of the Parish, in 2000, that number jumped to 16,447.

Music at St. William

Music has always been an integral part of Parish life for now over 100 years and for 60 of those years, was under the Direction of Mary Elizabeth (Betty) Green (B. 10/14/ 1924, D. 4/5/2015).  With the current diversity in cultural make up, comes a diversity in the Liturgical Music. Over 50 people make up the present Music Department of the Parish, under the direction of Parishioner and St. William School Graduate, Ken Houser who has served as Director since 2002. This Ministry consists of 3 choir groups with a total of 7 choirs — 1 English, 1 Spanish 1 Pakistani and 4 Haitian, and over a dozen professional cantors and 4 Organists/Pianists available for Liturgies.  Both Churches are equipped with 2 manual Rodgers Organs installed in 1981 under the direction of famed Philadelphia Organist, Keith Chapman. Piano's are also on hand in both churches.

In addition to singing select weekends of each Month, the parish English Choir occasionally visits other parish churches to either combine with or offer completely the services of a Choir for the Liturgy. They have sung on several occasions at St. Martin of Tours, St. Joachim, Holy Innocents, St. Bartholomew & St. Anne Parishes. The parish also has a guitar group and a schola that sings throughout the year for various Masses.

The parish has hosted visiting choirs on occasions, such as the Archdiocesan Boys Choir and the St. Augustine Filipino Choir, though this has grown rare in recent years.  One Choir, known simply as the "Nevilaires" is an amazing group of Alumni students from the Overbrook School for the Blind, formerly under the direction of Catherine Deraco and now under the capable direction of Vertner Hines. They traditionally sing for Veterans Day (the closest Sunday to) at the noon Mass in the Lower Church, among other occasions, and are well received.

In 2017, a Community Based Concert Series, known as St. William Sunday Concert Series, began hosting local community choirs, ensembles, orchestras and the like for its once monthly concerts. Free and open to the public, the concerts are generally held on the 3rd Sunday of each month at 2:00pm, and rely on the freewill offerings received at each concert. The first concert was held on October 15, 2017 and continued through May 2018, with the 2018-2019 & 2019-2020 seasons successfully booked.

Art within
Over the years, many parishioners have lent their hand in the creation of the various artifacts that are seen throughout the Parish buildings. Over the past 40 years several noteworthy creations have been given to the parish, restored or updated.

Hand-carved

As stated earlier, two Parishioners, Gregor Betz and James Gallagher created some of the most seen artifacts in the Parish. In addition to the Creche in the Upper Church Narthex, the Nativity painting seen hung outside of the church, the Last Supper adorning the Lower Church Altar (seen at left) which Mr. Betz carved in 1973, the processional crosses and candles used in both churches, there are other custom works of their art. In the Lower Church are displayed 4 hand carved plaques depicting the sacraments of Baptism, Confirmation, Holy Orders and Anointing of the Sick. He also created 2 addition plaques which hang over the side entrance doors - "Creation" and "Exodus." These were all created by Mr. Gallagher over a period from 1990 to 1992 with a personal story behind each one.  While all this work is extremely beautiful, one would certainly not say that they are alone in their "one of a kind" creations.

Hand-crafted

Centered within those 4 carvings listed above, is the Ambry that contains the Holy Oils. This Ambry, or case, was created and built by Parishioner William O'Donnell and takes the shape of the Church itself to house the 3 oils; the Oil of Catechumens, the Chrism and the Oil of the Sick. Unfortunately, Mr. O'Donnell passed away before he could complete the case and for years, the case hung on the wall of the church "as is" until the upper portions were completed last year by another parishioner in honor of Mr. O'Donnell. A Parishioner also created the altar on which the tabernacle of the Upper Church now sits, on the Main Altar. Again, a parishioner, in addition to creating the Creche Cabinet itself, created the crucifix that hangs under the baldachin of the Upper Church to hold the life sized Corpus Christi that was given to the parish by another long time Parishioner.

Hand-painted

Mr. Gallagher also created a set of "O Antiphons" which were hung in the Upper Church for years during Advent. Unfortunately, they were not thought of as significant at the time of their creation and the materials on which they were painted (rolled paper) have not withstood the test of time very well. They remain in delicate state, but selected Antiphons are carefully displayed during Advent and Christmas seasons.

Another parishioner took on the task of restoring and repainting the original statues of The Blessed Mother, St. Joseph, The Sacred Heart and St. Anthony that were from the second Church, along with the Pieta in the main vestibule of the church, all of which date to the 1920s. Many of these statues had long been stored away after they were removed from the Lower Church during renovations in 1990, when newer statues were purchased from Italy. The statues that were within the northeast stairwell tower of the Main School were also restored and now adorn the stairwells to the Upper Church Narthex. These statues stood in the original chapel also date from the 1920s.

Shrines

During the Fall of 2015, several statues within the Lower Church were shifted around and two shrines were completely redone by a parishioner. The shrine on the Rectory side of the Church that once housed the 1920s era Statues of St. Francis Xavier and St. Anthony, now houses the Miraculous Medal Shrine, using the original Blessed Mother Statue from the 1920s Church.  The Shrine on the Convent side which has housed Our Lady of Fatima for Decades was redone, both shrines include the Scripted Prayers of Each Devotion within the Shrine.

The Statues of St. Francis Xavier and St. Anthony were placed on the convent side of the Nave of the church, where the newer Blessed Mother and St. Joseph statues had been since renovations in 1991.  Blessed Mother and St Joseph Statues from the 1991 Renovations, now flank the Sanctuary.

In early 2016, The Shrines containing the statues of the Risen Christ and St. William of Vercelli, both carved by Gregor Betz, were completely redone by the same parishioner and unveiled following the Easter Vigil.

Señor de los Milagros

A parishioner from the Hispanic community painted "Lord of the Miracles", (principal feast day: October 28) as seen to the left, which hangs in the lower church in a hand made frame created in Peru. It is a gift to St. William from the Peruvian people of the parish who make up a very large portion of the local Hispanic community. Each year in October, the Peruvian Community of St. William host a celebration of this feast with a special Mass and procession around the neighborhood in which they carry a palanquin with a much larger version of this painting, on their shoulders, followed by a festival in the hall. With traditional music and prayer, while much smaller, this event is an echo of the same procession that takes place in Lima, Peru each year. This celebration draws hundreds of people of Peruvian descent from all over the Delaware Valley Region for the day-long event.

.

Hand-sewn

During the pastoral years of Msgr. Mortimer, decoration of the churches for the various liturgical holidays took on an entirely new meaning. In order to accomplish the ideas in his head, Mortimer tapped into the sewing talents of the women of the Parish. Over the course of nearly a decade, women in groups of up to 20 could be found working on projects for Monsignor Mortimer at any given time. Several sets of draperies were made for Easter and Christmas, in addition to other special events, so that a rotation could be had for 3–4 years without seeing the same thing each year. Each set was designed for the Upper Church, but could easily be adapted for use in the Lower Church. Many of these hand sewn projects can still be seen hanging in the church during these occasions, such as the dark blue drapes that hang in the photographs to the right of the Upper Church and Baldachin, with the individually sewn on silver stars, which is joined by ten  panels on which navy blue, light blue and silver fabric was sewn to use as a backdrop for each of the O Antiphons mentioned above that would hang from Advent through Christmas. Of other noteworthy sewing is the set of ten  panels of Tulips that are hung at Easter Time in the Nave of the Upper Church as well.  There were many other sets made and seen throughout the year. While today, this work may not seem all that unordinary, it was a first in the Diocese and the Parish was known citywide in the 1980s for the elaborate decorations that were seen within. Today, much of it has been scaled back to allow the proper focus on the Liturgical aspect of the Church, vs. elaboration.

Many of the women who worked on the creation of these decorations have long since passed on, but several can still be found at Sunday mass, critiquing the work of the newer generations who put up these displays.

Family Circus Comics
St. William Parish displays artwork by Bil Keane, who created the comic strip, Family Circus. Keane was a former student and was inducted into the Archdiocesan Hall of fame in November 1991. During a visit to the Parish in November 1991, he donated several posters that he created that relate to parish and school life. Keane's sketches, including a watercolor self-portrait, hang throughout the school buildings.

Stained glass

Lower church

All of the stained glass windows that are within the Lower Church, are expansions of the windows from the predecessor Gothic style church building that occupied the same site and are of 1920s vintage. It order to fit these windows into the current Church, the blue bands were added to each window.

There are 8 sets of 3 windows in the Nave and 4 sets of 2 in the transepts that make up the traditional 12 seen in most churches, which account for the 12 Apostles.  The center of each large windows depict several saints, including St. William, St. Peter, St. Charles Borromeo, St. Katherine of Sienna, St. Anne, St Joseph and Our Lady of Perpetual Help. The smaller windows depict Sts. Matthew, Mark, Luke John, Teresa and Bernard. In addition, there is the often unseen "hidden windows" of the Holy Name Society. Additional windows from the preceding church are found within the Sacristies of both churches.

Some of the stained glass windows in the original Lower church were made by a parishioner, William Gibson who was also a desk sergeant at the nearby Second District of the Philadelphia Police, adjacent to the Engine 64 firehouse, where L&I now has offices.  Unfortunately, due to the aforementioned Rectory Fire in 1965, and the loss of many historic files, the details of as to who or what company or person was in charge of designing and creating the stained glass within both churches are unknown at this time.

Upper church

The windows of the Upper Church, 40 years younger than the Lower Church, are unique but somewhat unadorned in comparison to what would be seen in the "Main" church of a large parish.

The windows are, in fact, significant. From outside the Church in each of the two stairwells leading up to the Narthex of the Upper Church, five windows can be seen, dedicated to the Virgin Mary; a total of 10 windows, ten as in a decade of the Rosary. There are eight additional windows in the Narthex, of which six are hidden behind the Creche, These too are dedicated to Mary.

Inside the Upper Church there are the traditional twelve windows, four on each side of the nave and two in each transept. The eight in the nave depict the Eucharistic Prayer as it transpires during the Mass. This is a unique set of windows; the priest's actions during the consecration can be followed in these windows.

The Rose window above the choir loft depicts the Holy Spirit shining down upon those who enter the Church. This window faces east; in the morning, when the sun shines brightly through this window it displays its depiction in deep red, gold, golden yellow, bright white and beige.

In the apse, behind the baldachin, are five windows of glass more colorful than the rest, which depict the life of Christ. From left to right they depict the Nativity, Presentation, Crucifixion, Resurrection and Ascension.

While the traditional church is built with the altar to the East, St. William is the opposite; this is not uncommon in large cities where land value often determined construction. The current substantial church building cost nearly $450,000 to build in 1955, equivalent to well over four million 2010 dollars.

Schools
St. William had a parish school which closed in 2012. It closed because of an enrollment decline. St. Cecilia School of Fox Chase, Philadelphia took most of the students while Presentation BVM School in Cheltenham took some.

Photographs

Pastors 

1920-1928 - (8 years)  Rev. William A. Motley
1928-1935 - (7 years)  Rev. Austin C. Grady
1935-1944 - (9 years)  Rev. Richard W. Gaughan
1944-1968 - (24 years)  Rev. William J. Boyle
1968-1980 - (12 years)  Rev. Francis J. Kimble
1980-2002 - (22 years)  Rev. Msgr. James E. Mortimer
2002-2009 - (7 years)  Rev. Msgr. Nelson J. Perez
2009-2010 - (17 months) Rev. Scott D. Brockson (6 months as Pastoral Administrator)
2009-2016 - (7 years) Rev. Joseph G. Watson
2016-(----) - (Current) Rev. Alfonso J. Concha

Vocations from St William

Over 100 men and women have taken vocations from St William Parish over the years, including Monsignor Joseph Tracy, Bishop Martin Lohmuller, our recent former Pastor, Fr. Joe Watson and our current Deacon, William Moser.
Currently, the parish is proud to have one of their own as a seminarian preparing for ordination to the priesthood of the Archdioces of Philadelphia - Mr. Roneld St. Louis.

Note: Rev. William A. Motley is reportedly buried between the Parish Church and Rectory in the small garden where a tombstone marks only his tenure here at the parish, not his actual birth and death dates (Born 12/5/1867, Died 10/21/1928). A Solemn Requiem Mass was celebrated on Oct 25, 1928 by Bishop Crane.  While the church was built with two crypts (one on the North side and one on the South side of the building) neither have ever been used.

Notable parishioners 

William (Bil) Keane, Creator of the Family Circus, is a St. William School Graduate, Class of 1936.
De'Andre Hunter St. William School Graduate Class of 2012 Hunter-comes-up-big-for-national-champs

References

External links

 St. William Parish
 
 Archdiocese of Philadelphia 

Lawncrest
Irish-American culture in Philadelphia
Roman Catholic churches in Philadelphia
Northeast Philadelphia
Roman Catholic parishes in the United States